Sherlock Jr. is a 2018 Philippine television drama crime series starring Ruru Madrid, Gabbi Garcia and Serena the Dog, voiced by Mikee Quintos. The series premiered on GMA Network's GMA Telebabad evening block and worldwide on GMA Pinoy TV on January 29, 2018 to April 27, 2018, replacing Super Ma'am.

NUTAM (Nationwide Urban Television Audience Measurement) People in Television Homes ratings are provided by AGB Nielsen Philippines.

Series overview

Episodes

January 2018

February 2018

March 2018

April 2018

References

Lists of Philippine drama television series episodes